Visitors to India must obtain a visa unless they come from one of the visa-exempt countries. Nationals of certain countries may obtain a visa on arrival or an e-Visa online, while others must obtain a visa from an Indian diplomatic mission.

Visa policy map

Freedom of movement

Nationals of the following countries do not need visas or passports to enter India (unless arriving from mainland China, Hong Kong, Macau, Maldives or Pakistan) and may live and work in the country without any limit of stay.

Overseas citizens of India and persons of Indian origin
Foreign nationals possessing an Overseas Citizen of India card or a Persons of Indian Origin Card are exempt from visa requirements and may live and work in India without any limit of stay. Nationals of Bangladesh and Pakistan are not entitled to hold Overseas Citizenship of India.

Visa-free entry
From March 1979, nationals of  do not need visas to enter India for stays of up to 90 days (unless arriving from mainland China).

Visa on arrival 

Nationals of the following countries holding ordinary passports may apply for a visa on arrival (VOA) at certain airports:

The visa on arrival is issued to visitors for business, tourism, medical or conference purposes, for a stay of up to 60 days, at a cost of ₹2,000. Visitors are not eligible for this facility if they or any of their parents or grandparents were born in or have permanently resided in Pakistan, in which case they may only apply for a visa at an Indian diplomatic post. The VOA facility can be used for up to two times in a calendar year. Alternatively, foreign nationals eligible for a VOA can apply for an e-Visa instead if they intend to enter the country through an airport or seaport not covered by the VOA scheme.

e-Visa 
Nationals of the following countries and territories holding ordinary passports may apply for an electronic visa (e-Visa) online:

E-Visas are issued for several categories, validity periods and fees, which also vary for some nationalities:

Visitors are not eligible for e-Visas if they or any of their parents or grandparents were born in or have permanently resided in Pakistan, in which case they may only apply for a visa at an Indian diplomatic post.

E-Visas may only be used for arrival at the following airports and seaports:

Exit is possible via any authorized immigration check post.

History

2013
In October 2013, India decided to initiate the process of extending visa-on-arrival access to 40 more nations. In January 2014, plans were confirmed by Minister of State for Parliamentary Affairs and Planning of India. The sixteen different types of visa would also be reduced to three: work, business and tourism. The proposal initially met resistance from intelligence agencies and the possible problem of queues emerged.

2014
In February 2014 it was announced that Indian intelligence agencies had given their approval to visa-on-arrival for up to 180 countries, largely due to the new possibilities provided by the Immigration, Visa and Foreigners' Registration and Tracking (IVFRT) system. The system would not be a typical visa on arrival in order to avoid clutter at the airports, but a system based on a prior online application modelled after Australian Electronic Travel Authority system.

On 5 February 2014 it was decided to introduce visa-on-arrival to tourists from 180 countries. Technical implementation, such as setting up the website for applications, was expected to take about 6 months and the authorities hoped to have it in place for the tourist season beginning in October 2014. Prospective visitors would have to pay a fee and the electronic version of the visa should be granted within three days. The program was expected to apply to all international airports. However, nationals of Afghanistan, Iran, Iraq, Nigeria, Pakistan, Somalia, Sudan were to be excluded from this program.

In July 2014 it was announced that India hoped to implement the program for citizens of 40 countries in the first phase by December 2014 and later on for 109 additional countries if the first phase were implemented successfully.

In August 2014 it was revealed that ministries of Tourism, Home Affairs and External Affairs could not agree on the list of countries for the ETA. The Ministry of Tourism proposed to allow the new system for the citizens of the 15 countries with the most visitors to India, the Ministry of External Affairs proposed to create a balanced list with some Asian and African countries, while the Ministry of Home Affairs proposed to exclude all countries with high security concerns.

In September 2014 Indian Prime Minister Narendra Modi announced that the United States would be added to the list of countries whose citizens may obtain a visa on arrival. However, in October 2014 the planned introduction of the new e-Visa system was pushed from 2 October 2014 to June 2015. It was also revealed that the list of visa on arrival countries was unlikely to be expanded in 2014.

In November 2014 it was announced that the e-visa system might be rolled out for about 25 countries including the 13 countries that were already eligible for visa on arrival. Later that month it was announced that 28 countries would become eligible for an electronic visa on 27 November 2014 and that the list would include visa on arrival eligible countries as well as Brazil, Germany, Israel, Jordan, Mauritius, Norway, Palestine, Russia, Thailand, Ukraine, United Arab Emirates, United States.

In November 2014, the Indian Prime Minister announced visa on arrival facility for nationals of all Pacific countries and Australia.

2015
The manual processing of the visa on arrival was discontinued in January 2015. Until 26 January 2015, citizens of the following countries holding ordinary passports were granted visa on arrival without obtaining an ETA (unless they were of Pakistani origin), for a single stay up to 30 days in India when traveling as a tourist or for visiting family or friends:

In February 2015, the Ministry of Tourism proposed extending the facility to citizens of China, United Kingdom, Spain, France, Italy and Malaysia. Subsequently, the Minister of Finance announced that the facility would be extended, in stages, to citizens of 150 countries. In March 2015 it was announced that 53 nations were shortlisted for the second round of expansion of the system based on the number of tourist arrivals in the previous years.

After the Government was criticised for naming the new policy "Visa on arrival" it decided to rename it to "e-Tourist Visa (eTV)" in April 2015.

The e-Tourist Visa facility was extended to 31 new countries on 1 May 2015.

In May 2015, Indian Foreign Ministry announced that Chinese citizens will be able to apply for e-Tourist Visa facility in order to coordinate Prime Minister Narendra Modi visiting China between 14 and 16 May. Disputes about the Sino-Indian border and national security would be postponed.

On 29 July 2015 Indian Ministry of Home Affairs announced the extension of e-Tourist Visa facility to China, Hong Kong and Macau with effect from 30 July 2015.

The list of eligible nationalities was extended with 36 new countries on 15 August 2015. On the same day the list of eTV airports was expanded with 7 new airports. The extension to 150 nationalities was scheduled to be finished by 31 March 2016.

In September 2015 it was announced that the list would be expanded by another 37 countries.

2016
In January 2016 it was announced that the extension would take place by March 2016. In November 2015 it was announced that the visa validity will be extended to 180 days.

In January 2016 it was announced that the multiple entries would become available and that e-Tourist Visa holders would receive a gift pack on arrival.

The eTV list was extended for tourists from 37 more countries on 26 February 2016.

In September 2016 it was announced that the electronic visa scheme would be reformed to include 27 visa codes denoting various visit purposes such as tourism, business or medical visits. It was also announced that the list of visa on arrival eligible countries would be expanded.

On 30 November 2016 the Government of India approved further liberalization, simplification and rationalization of visa regime in India. It also announced that more countries would be added to the e-visa list. The e-visa would have a validity of 60 days and could be applied for by foreign nationals up to four months ahead of the visit. Five seaports – Mumbai, Kochi, Chennai, Goa and Mangalore – would receive tourists coming with e-visa.

2017
From 1 April 2017 e-visas are granted under three categories of tourist, business and medical. The window for application under e-visa scheme was increased from 30 days to 120 days, and duration of stay on e-visa was increased from 30 days to 60 days, with double entry on e-tourist and e-business visa, and triple entry on e-medical visa. The list of eligible nationalities was also further expanded with 11 new countries, and the list of arrival ports was increased from 16 to 24 airports and 3 seaports.

In July 2017 Uganda was added to the list of e-Visa eligible countries.

2018
During 2018, Iran, Kazakhstan, Kyrgyzstan and Qatar were added to the list of e-Visa eligible countries.

2019
In January 2019 the Indian government updated e-Visa rules for all eligible countries. The validity of Indian e-tourist and e-Business Visa was increased from 60 days with double entry to up-to 1 year with multiple entries. The validity count starts from the day of being granted the e-visa online and not from the day of physical entry as before.

For e-tourist visa, continuous stay during each visit shall not exceed 90 days for all eligible nationals of e-tourist visa except for nationals of US, UK, Japan and Canada. For nationals of US, UK, Japan and Canada, continuous stay during each visit should not exceed 180 days. No FRRO (Foreigners Regional Registration Officer) registration is required.

For e-business visa, continuous stay during each visit should not exceed 180 days for nationals of all countries who are eligible for grant of e-business visa and no FRRO (Foreigners Regional Registration Officer) registration is required if the stay is for less than 180 days.

During 2019, Saudi Arabia, Belarus and Benin were added to the list of e-Visa eligible countries.

In August 2019, Indian Government announced a 30 Day Visa during the peak season for 25 Dollars.

2020
During 2020, Equatorial Guinea and Togo were added to the list of e-Visa eligible countries.

2021
During 2021, Canada, the United Kingdom and 13 Asian countries and territories were removed from the e-Visa facility, and Afghanistan was added.

2022 
In 2022, the Indian government announced plans to introduce an Ayush visa for those coming to India for traditional medicine.

In December 2022, the e-Visa facility was resumed for nationals of Canada, the United Kingdom and seven Asian countries that had been removed in 2021.

2023 
In March 2023, the e-Visa facility was resumed for nationals of Saudi Arabia, which had been removed in 2021.

Costs of visa applications
Visa applications can be submitted in person or sent by post to an Indian consulate. It can also be submitted to designated visa service provider in certain countries. Costs differ per consulate and region. Some visa-handling services charge a small fee in addition, to check that completed application form meets all requirements and submit the documents on the applicant's behalf.

Restricted and protected area permits

A Protected Area Permit (PAP) is required to enter the states of Arunachal Pradesh and Sikkim and some parts of the states of Himachal Pradesh, Jammu and Kashmir, Rajasthan and Uttarakhand. A Restricted Area Permit (RAP) is required to enter the Andaman and Nicobar Islands and parts of Sikkim. Some of these requirements are occasionally lifted for a year at a time. Permits are not required for nationals of Bhutan travelling by air to/from Thimphu via Bagdogra and for nationals of Nepal travelling by air to/from Kathmandu (if travelling by land a pass issued by either the Foreigners Regional Registration Office, Superintendent of police or the diplomatic representation of India in Bhutan or Nepal is required). Special permits are needed to enter Lakshadweep Islands. Maldivian citizens are allowed to visit Minicoy island for fifteen days if allowed by the High Commissioner of India to the Maldives.

Pakistani passport holders and persons of Pakistani origin
Persons who ever held Pakistani citizenship, or who have a parent or spouse that held Pakistani citizenship are ineligible for e-Visas, and so must apply to their local Indian mission for visas. Applicants who once held Pakistani citizenship require lengthy processing times, while foreign spouses and those of Pakistani origin who never held Pakistani citizenship typically experience shorter processing times. India also forbids Pakistani applicants with dual nationality from applying on their non-Pakistani passport.

Visa on arrival for persons over 65 years of age
As of 31 March 2013, Pakistani citizens over the age of 65 with the sole objective of meeting friends or family are granted a 45-day visa upon arrival at the Attari-Wagah Checkpoint, so long as the applicant provides a sponsorship certificate from their contacts in India attesting that they will be responsible for the visit of their Pakistani friend or relative, and which must also be countersigned by a DM, SP, SDM, Tehsildar, BDO, SHO, Groups A officer of State and Central Government, or principal/headmaster of a government college or government school who attest that they personally know the sponsor. This scheme does not apply to those who wish to visit Punjab, Kerala and Restricted Areas, nor does it apply to those who have ever been denied an Indian visa before.

Diplomatic or official passports

Holders of diplomatic or service category passports of the following countries do not require a visa for India – Albania, Antigua and Barbuda, Argentina, Azerbaijan, Bahamas, Bahrain, Bangladesh, Barbados, Belarus, Belize, Benin, Bolivia, Brazil, Brunei, Bulgaria, Cambodia, Chile, Colombia, Comoros, Costa Rica, Croatia, Cyprus, Denmark, Ecuador, Egypt, El Salvador, Equatorial Guinea, Eswatini, Georgia, Ghana, Grenada, Guatemala, Guyana, Honduras, Hungary, Iceland, Indonesia, Israel, Ivory Coast, Jordan, Kazakhstan, Kuwait, Kyrgyzstan, Laos, Lesotho, Malaysia, Maldives, Marshall Islands, Mauritius, Mexico, Mongolia, Morocco, Mozambique, Myanmar, Namibia, Nicaragua, Oman, Palestine, Panama, Paraguay, Peru, Philippines, Qatar, Russia, Rwanda, Saint Kitts and Nevis, Saint Vincent and the Grenadines, Serbia, Singapore, South Africa, South Korea, Sri Lanka, Suriname, Syria, Tajikistan, Tanzania, Thailand, Tunisia, Uganda, United Arab Emirates, Uruguay, Venezuela and Vietnam and diplomatic passports only of the following countries – Afghanistan, Armenia, Botswana, Cuba, Czech Republic, Estonia, Finland, France, Germany, Greece, Iran, Italy, Japan, Kenya, Latvia, Lithuania, Malta, North Macedonia, Norway, Poland, Portugal, Romania, Slovenia, Spain, Sweden, Switzerland, Turkey, Turkmenistan, Ukraine, Uzbekistan, Zambia, Zimbabwe.

India signed visa waiver agreements for holders of diplomatic, special and official passports with the following countries, which are yet to come into force:

Malawi – 5 November 2018
Algeria – February 2019
Dominican Republic – August 2019
Ethiopia – February 2021

Visa types 

 If visa is for more than 180 days, registration is compulsory within 14 days of arrival in India.

Requirement of Identification Papers to Establish Their Identity as Nepalese or Indian for Persons Entering India or Nepal from Either Country by Air

Instructions have been issued whereby Nepalese and Indian citizens, while travelling by air, between the two countries must be in possession of any of the following documents to prove their nationality:

 Valid national passport
 Valid photo identity card issued by the Government of India / State Government or UT Administration / Election Commission of India
 Emergency certificate issued by the Embassy of India, Kathmandu to Indians and by the Embassy of Nepal in Delhi in respect of Nepalese citizens

Visitor statistics 
Most visitors arriving in India were from the following countries of nationality:

In 2017 most e-Visas were issued to the following countries of nationality:

See also 

Visa requirements for Indian citizens
Tourism in India

Notes

References

External links
Indian Visa Online, Government of India
Bureau of Immigration
Ayush Visa Benefits

Foreign relations of India
India
Policies of India
Tourism in India
India tourism-related lists